The Five Nations Roller Derby Championships is an annual competition for roller derby leagues in the United Kingdom.

History
The tournament originated as the End of the World Series, a 2012 league of six roller derby teams in central England.  The success of this competition led it to expand in 2013 under the new name of the Heartland Series, with twelve teams in two division, and it doubled in size again in 2014. In 2021, the competition rebranded as the Five Nations Roller Derby Championships.

2015 Championships
In 2015, the tournament partnered with the United Kingdom Roller Derby Association (UKRDA) and was renamed as the British Roller Derby Championships.   This greatly expanded competition consisted of 72 teams playing across several tiers, making it the largest roller derby competition in Europe.  For the first time, it accepted teams from across the UK, including a separate competition for men's teams.

2016 Championships
As of 2016, the women's section of the tournament is divided into five tiers.  Tiers 2 to 4 are further split between geographical divisions of four to six teams.  Teams competing in the two top tiers must hold membership of the UKRDA.

The men's section is divided into three tiers, with the third tier divided into two geographical divisions.

2017 Championships
For 2017, the women's section was rationalised to four tiers.

2018 Championships

2019 Championships

References

2015 establishments in the United Kingdom
Roller derby competitions
Roller derby in the United Kingdom